The foreign relations of South Sudan are the relations between the Republic of South Sudan and sovereign states and international organizations. The establishment of the relationships followed the formation of the South Sudanese state on 9 July 2011. South Sudan's former parent country Sudan became the first state in the world to recognize South Sudan.

Foreign policy

In the immediate aftermath of the country's independence, South Sudan's foreign policy prerogative was seen as a challenge in the quest to balance relations between the West, other African states and the Arab states. Since independence, South Sudan has sought to shed its reliance on Sudan, reportedly planning to introduce the Swahili language and orient itself toward East Africa.

Chronology of relations

Sudan was the first country to recognise the independence of South Sudan on 8 July 2011, 1 day prior to independence. Four other states followed suit on 8 July. Over 25 countries had recognised the country on 9 July, including all permanent members of the United Nations Security Council.

On 14 July 2011, South Sudan was admitted as a member of the United Nations without a vote or objections raised by its members.

Both before and after South Sudan admission to the UN, many states have issued official explicit statements about its diplomatic recognition and some have established diplomatic relations with it. In less than half a year the number of recognitions reached over 115 and the number of relations established over 50.

United Nations member states

Non-members of the UN

Representation in South Sudan

The United States upgraded its Juba consulate to an embassy on 9 July 2011, as did France. Also Sudan has announced that it plans to open an embassy in Juba, upon independence, while Egypt has announced it intends to convert its existing consulate in Juba into a full embassy. The United Kingdom has opened an embassy in South Sudan, as well.

On 16 September 2011, the ambassadors of the United Kingdom and Norway presented their credentials, the first to do so. Credentials were presented on 15 November of that year by Chinese, German and Kenyan ambassadors.

International organisations

South Sudan became a member of the United Nations on 13 July 2011. It joined the African Union on 27 July 2011. It's also a member in: the Inter-Parliamentary Union (IPU), the International Criminal Police Organization (Interpol), the International Development Association (IDA), the International Federation of Red Cross and Red Crescent Societies (IFRCS), the International Fund for Agricultural Development (IFAD), and the International Organization for Migration (IOM).

South Sudan has also either applied or is in the process of applying to the Common Market for Eastern and Southern Africa, the Commonwealth of Nations, the East African Community, the Intergovernmental Authority on Development, the International Monetary Fund, and the World Bank. South Sudan has also been assured membership in the Arab League, should it decide to pursue membership, though it could also opt for observer status. it may also seek membership in the Organisation of Islamic Cooperation, which has expressed interest in giving South Sudan admission despite not being a majority Muslim state.

On 24 July 2011, President Salva Kiir told the Speaker of the East African Legislative Assembly that he hoped the EAC will consider expediting South Sudan's accession to the supranational organisation. South Sudan is considered very likely to join the EAC, but an exact timetable for admission has not yet been mooted publicly.

South Sudan is observer state of Non-Aligned Movement.

Americas

Asia

Oceania

Other continents

Bangladesh

Bangladesh recognizes the independence of South Sudan on 20 July 2011.

China

China recognizes the independence of South Sudan on 9 July 2011.

Comoros 
First ambassador of South Sudan to Comoros presented his credentials to Comoros in 2018.

Denmark 
First ambassador of South Sudan to Denmark presented his credentials to Denmark in 2016.

Egypt

Essam Sharaf, Prime Minister of Egypt after the Arab Spring-inspired revolution in 2011 made his first foreign visit to Khartoum and Juba in the lead-up to South Sudan's secession. Egypt was one of four countries to recognise South Sudan as an independent state on the first day.

India

India recognized South Sudan on 9 July 2011

Israel

Relations between the two states commenced with Israel's recognition of South Sudan a day after its independence and South Sudan announcing the following week its intention to establish full diplomatic relations with Israel. On 28 July 2011, it was announced that full diplomatic ties had been established between the two countries. This was considered a significant boon to Israel, as Sudan did not have diplomatic relations with Israel and did not recognize Israeli sovereignty. This changed under the Israel–Sudan normalization agreement.

Economic ties show the most potential. As of 23 July 2011, several Israeli companies are already in talks for various business deals. Israel is host to thousands of refugees from South Sudan, who are now ready to return to their native country.

South Korea

The Republic of Korea government is providing for the South Korean military to South Sudan in UN Mission (UNMISS) in South Sudan.

Sudan

Since independence relations with Sudan have been under negotiation. Sudan's then President Omar al-Bashir first announced, in January 2011, that dual citizenship in the North and the South would be allowed, but upon the independence of South Sudan he retracted the offer. He has also suggested an EU-style confederation. In February 2012, an agreement was reached by which citizens of both countries could live, work, and own property in both countries, and freely travel between the two.

Turkey

Both countries established diplomatic relations in 2012
 South Sudan has an embassy in Ankara.
Turkey has an embassy in Juba.
Trade volume between the two countries was US$3.2 million in 2019.

Uganda

Prior to independence relations between the two states were fostered through cultural contacts such as the presence of South Sudanese students in Uganda. As independence approaches the two states started to enhance their economic ties. However, the Lord's Resistance Army's presence in South Sudan was a stumbling block.

South Sudan and the Commonwealth of Nations

See also; South Sudan and the Commonwealth of Nations

South Sudan has applied for full membership of the Commonwealth. If and when it is accepted, South Sudan will become the newest republic in the Commonwealth of Nations.

See also

 List of diplomatic missions in South Sudan
 List of diplomatic missions of South Sudan
 Moustapha Soumaré

Notes

References